Christopher Rosario (born January 28, 1979) is an American politician who has served in the Connecticut House of Representatives from the 128th district since 2015.

References

1979 births
Living people
Politicians from Bridgeport, Connecticut
Democratic Party members of the Connecticut House of Representatives
21st-century American politicians